Chiuiești is a commune in Cluj County, Transylvania, Romania. It is composed of seven villages: Chiuiești, Dosu Bricii (Bricshát), Huta (Huta), Măgoaja (Hollómező), Strâmbu (Horgospataka), Valea Cășeielului (Kesiel), and Valea lui Opriș (Oprisvölgy).

The commune is located in the northernmost corner of the county, bordering the Sălaj, Maramureș, and Bistrița-Năsăud counties.

Demographics 
At the 2011 census, Chiuiești had a population of 2,332, of whom 98.8% were ethnic Romanians and 1.1% Roma.

Natives
Gurie Georgiu (1968–2021), Romanian Orthodox prelate, first Bishop of the Diocese of Deva and Hunedoara.
Pintea the Brave (1670–1703), heroic haiduc.

References 

Communes in Cluj County
Localities in Transylvania